Bandza is a village located in the west part of Georgia, Martvili municipality (in the Samegrelo-Zemo Svaneti region). It consists of three small villages: Levakhane, Lekekele, Lepatarave. Bandza is situated on Odishi-Guria plain, on the left side of the river Abasha. 
It is 7 kilometers to Martvili from Bandza and 22 kilometers to Abasha. According to the data of 2014, 1099 people live in the village. 
Bandza is under Chkondidi Diocese.

History 
Bandza was first mentioned in 1699–1740 in the description of Russian Ambassador. In 1658 there was a battle between kings of Imereti and Guria-Samegrelo. Vakhushti Batonishvili writes about the village as “Bandza and castle kindly built”. There is marked “Bandza-Paghao Castle” on the map of the west Georgia created in 1797.

Synagogue 

In the second half of 18th century Jewish people started to live in the west part of Georgia. They settled in Kulevi, Kutaisi, Poti, Senaki and lately in Bandza. At the beginning of 20th century they built a synagogue in the Jewish district of Bandza. There is also Jewish cemetery near the synagogue. The synagogue is not active today but many Jewish people visit it very often.

Famous People 
Georgian footballer Murtaz Khurtsilava was born in Bandza.
Famous Georgian Theater and Film actor Anzor Urdia was originally from Banzda.

See also
 Samegrelo-Zemo Svaneti

References

Populated places in Samegrelo-Zemo Svaneti